"Buffalo Gals" is a traditional American song, written and published as "Lubly Fan" in 1844 by the blackface minstrel John Hodges, who performed as "Cool White". The song was widely popular throughout the United States, where minstrels often altered the lyrics to suit local audiences, performing it as "New York Gals" in New York City, "Boston Gals" in Boston, or "Alabama Girls" in Alabama, as in the version recorded by Alan Lomax and Shirley Collins on a 1959 field recording trip. The best-known version is named after Buffalo, New York.

The chorus is:

Buffalo gals, won't you come out tonight?
Come out tonight, 
Come out tonight?
Buffalo gals, won't you come out tonight,
And dance by the light of the moon?

The Western Writers of America chose it as one of the Top 100 Western Songs of all time.

Origination
The lyrics are a reference to the many "dancing girls" who performed in the bars, concert-hall dives, and brothels of the Buffalo, New York, Canal district, which at that time was the western terminus of the Erie Canal and the site where canal and freighter crewmen received their wages.

Adaptations
The English singing game "Pray, Pretty Miss" may have been an inspiration for the lyric, according to Frank Brown in "Collection of North Carolina Folklore". The tune is reminiscent of "Im Grunewald, im Grunewald ist Holzauktion", a music hall song from Germany that was however first published in 1892.
A new set of lyrics to the same tune entitled "Dance with a Dolly (with a Hole in Her Stocking)" became a success in 1944 when it was recorded by a number of artists. Charted versions were by Russ Morgan, Evelyn Knight and Tony Pastor. In the decades since, versions in genres ranging from children's choir to disco have been recorded. Notable recordings have included Bing Crosby (for his album Bing Crosby's Treasury - The Songs I Love (1968 version)), The Andrews Sisters, Bill Haley & His Comets and Damita Jo.
A 1959 adaptation by Bobby Darin called "Plain Jane" went to number 38 on the Billboard chart.
A 1960 hit by Ray Smith, "Rockin' Little Angel" is based on the same melody.
A 1961 album by The Olympics, Dance by the Light of the Moon includes the title song which borrows part of the melody and lyrics, reworking it into a doo-wop song.

In popular culture
 The line "They danced by the light of the moon" shows up a little more than a quarter century later in Edward Lear's poem, "The Owl and the Pussycat", published in 1870.
 In Frank Capra's 1946 film It's a Wonderful Life, Mary and George Bailey sing the song together in the scene where George "lassos" the Moon.
 Ursula Le Guin wrote a science fiction novelette titled after the song's first line, "Buffalo Gals, Won't You Come Out Tonight", in 1987.

References

External links
 , performed by The Pickard Family
 Alabama Girls  by Emma Hammond
 Buffalo Gals by John Renfro Davis
 The sheet music

American folk songs
Western music (North America)
Burl Ives songs
Songs about dancing